The 2022 Atlantic Coast Conference football season, part of the 2022 NCAA Division I FBS football season, was the 70th season of college football played for the Atlantic Coast Conference (ACC). The ACC consisted of 14 members in two divisions. The entire schedule was released on January 31, 2022. This was the last season that the conference used divisions in its football scheduling.

Previous season

Pittsburgh defeated Wake Forest 45−21 in the ACC Football Championship Game at Bank of America Stadium in Charlotte, North Carolina.

Preseason

Recruiting classes

Note: ESPN only ranks the top 40 teams.

ACC Kickoff
The 2022 ACC Kickoff will be held on July 20 and 21 at the Westin hotel in Charlotte, North Carolina. Each team will have there head coach and three players available to talk to the media. Coverage of the event will be televised by the ACC Network. The preseason poll was released on July 26, 2022.  The poll projected Clemson to win the conference title for the seventh time in the last eight years.

Preseason ACC Player of the year
Source:

Preseason all-conference teams

Source:

Defense

Specialist

Preseason awards

All−American Teams

Preseason award watchlists

Coaches

Coaching changes
The ACC entered the 2022 season with four new head football coaches:

 On November 16, 2021, Virginia Tech head coach Justin Fuente agreed to part ways with the program and was replaced by Brent Pry on November 30, 2021.
 On November 28, 2021, Duke head coach David Cutcliffe agreed to part ways with the program and was replaced by Mike Elko on December 10, 2021.
 On December 2, 2021, Virginia head coach Bronco Mendenhall stepped down as head coach and was replaced by Tony Elliott on December 10, 2021.
 On December 6, 2021, Miami head coach Manny Diaz was fired and was replaced by Mario Cristobal on December 7, 2021.

Head coaching records

Notes
Records shown after the 2021 season
Years at school includes the 2022 season

Rankings

Schedule
The regular season began on Saturday August 27, 2022, and will end on Saturday November 26, 2022. The ACC Championship Game will be played on Saturday December 3, 2022, at Bank of America Stadium in Charlotte, North Carolina.

Regular season

Week zero

Week one

Week two

Week three

Week four

Week five

Week six

Week seven

Week eight

Week nine

Week ten

Week eleven

Week twelve

Week thirteen

Championship Game

ACC vs other conferences

ACC vs Power Five matchups
The following games include ACC teams competing against Power Five conferences teams from the Big Ten, Big 12, BYU/Notre Dame, Pac-12 and SEC). All rankings are from the AP Poll at the time of the game.

ACC vs Group of Five matchups
The following games include ACC teams competing against teams from the American, C-USA, MAC, Mountain West or Sun Belt.

ACC vs FBS independents matchups
The following games include ACC teams competing against FBS Independents, which includes Army, Liberty, New Mexico State, UConn or UMass.

ACC vs FCS matchups
The Football Championship Subdivision comprises 13 conferences and two independent programs.

Records against other conferences

Regular Season

Post Season

Postseason
The bowl games began on December 17, 2022, and will end with the Orange Bowl on December 30, 2022.

Bowl games

For the 2020–2025 bowl cycle, The ACC will have annually ten appearances in the following bowls: Orange Bowl and Peach Bowl (unless they are selected for playoffs filled by a SEC and at-large team if champion is in the playoffs), Military Bowl, Duke's Mayo Bowl, Gator Bowl, Cheez-It Bowl, Fenway Bowl, ReliaQuest Bowl, Holiday Bowl and Sun Bowl. The ACC teams will go to a New Year's Six bowl if a team finishes higher than the champions of Power Five conferences in the final College Football Playoff rankings. The ACC champion are also eligible for the College Football Playoff if they're among the top four teams in the final CFP ranking.

Rankings are from CFP rankings. All times Eastern Time Zone. ACC teams shown in bold.

Awards and honors

Player of the week honors

All Conference Teams
Source:

First Team

Second Team

Third Team

ACC individual awards

ACC Player of the Year
 Drake Maye, North Carolina 

ACC Rookie of the Year
Drake Maye, North Carolina

ACC Coach of the Year
Mike Elko, Duke

ACC Offensive Player of the Year
 Drake Maye, North Carolina 

ACC Offensive Rookie of the Year
 Drake Maye, North Carolina

Jacobs Blocking Trophy
 Jordan McFadden, Clemson

ACC Defensive Player of the Year
 Calijah Kancey, Pittsburgh

ACC Defensive Rookie of the Year
 Patrick Payton, Florida State

All-Americans

Consensus All-Americans

Currently, the NCAA compiles consensus all-America teams in the sports of Division I FBS football and Division I men's basketball using a point system computed from All-America teams named by coaches associations or media sources.  Players are chosen against other players playing at their position only.  To be selected a consensus All-American, players must be chosen to the first team on at least half of the five official selectors as recognized by the NCAA.  Second- and third-team honors are used to break ties.  Players named first-team by all five selectors are deemed unanimous All-Americans. Currently, the NCAA recognizes All-Americans selected by the AP, AFCA, FWAA, TSN, and the WCFF to determine consensus and unanimous All-Americans.

Associated Press

AFCA

FWAA

The Sporting News

WCFF

National Awards
 Wuerffel Trophy: Dillan Gibbons, Florida State

 Disney Spirit Award: Tylee Craft, North Carolina

 Lou Groza Award: Christopher Dunn, NC State

Home game attendance

Bold – Exceeded capacity
†Season High

References